KBEV-FM (98.3 FM) is a radio station licensed to serve Dillon, Montana.  The station is owned by Dead-Air Broadcasting Company. It airs an adult contemporary music format.

The station was assigned the KBEV-FM call letters by the Federal Communications Commission on April 1, 1998.

In addition to its usual music programming, the station carries selected local high school and college sporting events.

Translators

References

External links
KBEV-FM official website

BEV-FM
Mainstream adult contemporary radio stations in the United States
Beaverhead County, Montana
Radio stations established in 1998